Chester is a census-designated place on Kent Island in Queen Anne's County, Maryland, United States. The population was 3,723 at the 2000 census.

Geography
Chester is located at  (38.971907, −76.288045).

Demographics

As of the census of 2000, there were 3,723 people, 1,567 households, and 1,037 families residing in the CDP. The racial makeup of the CDP was 89.61% White, 7.06% African American, 0.13% Native American, 1.02% Asian, 0.05% Pacific Islander, 0.59% from other races, and 1.53% from two or more races. Hispanic or Latino of any race were 1.32% of the population.

There were 1,567 households, out of which 28.1% had children under the age of 18 living with them, 50.4% were married couples living together, 11.8% had a female householder with no husband present, and 33.8% were non-families. 27.1% of all households were made up of individuals, and 10.2% had someone living alone who was 65 years of age or older. The average household size was 2.38 and the average family size was 2.87.

In the CDP, the population was spread out, with 23.1% under the age of 18, 6.6% from 18 to 24, 30.3% from 25 to 44, 26.0% from 45 to 64, and 14.0% who were 65 years of age or older. The median age was 39 years. For every 100 females, there were 94.3 males. For every 100 females age 18 and over, there were 90.8 males.

The median income for a household in the CDP was $56,558, and the median income for a family was $60,195. Males had a median income of $42,289 versus $30,495 for females. The per capita income for the CDP was $27,789. About 3.3% of families and 4.9% of the population were below the poverty line, including 7.5% of those under age 18 and 3.7% of those age 65 or over.

Notable person
Charles Willson Peale, painter, soldier and naturalist

References

Census-designated places in Queen Anne's County, Maryland
Census-designated places in Maryland
Kent Island, Maryland
Maryland populated places on the Chesapeake Bay